"Uninvited Guests" is the twelfth episode of the fourth series of the British comedy TV series Dad's Army. It was originally transmitted on Friday, 11 December 1970.

Synopsis
Following the bombing of ARP HQ, Hodges moves his wardens into the church hall alongside the Home Guard. Mainwaring, appalled by this development, protests to the vicar, Area HQ, the Civil Defence people and a fellow Rotarian, and eventually Hodges' mob are ordered to leave, but not for another week.

Plot
While Mainwaring is testing his new communication system, talking through sweet tins strung together by string, trouble is brewing on the horizon. The ARP Headquarters was bombed the previous night, and the town clerk and vicar have given them permission to move in with the Home Guard at the church hall. Mainwaring, naturally, is appalled at having to share his office with Hodges, and the hall with his "rabble". He orders his men to get rid of him, and Corporal Jones chases him out with a bayonet.

Hodges returns, this time with the vicar and the verger and takes over half the hall. The Home Guard platoon struggle to come to terms with this new sharing arrangement, and even Walker who's usually shrewd in business is unimpressed, though he takes the chance to sell the Wardens a 'firelighter' to light the stove. While Mainwaring and Hodges are wrestling for control of the office telephone, a call comes through warning them of a fire that has started at a large building next to St Aldhems church. After initially calling for the fire brigade, they realise that it is in fact their own headquarters burning, and the chimney set alight by Walker's firelighter.

The Wardens and Home Guard combine forces to try to put it out, entailing a rooftop drama with a hose and buckets of water. Eventually Wilson puts out the fire with a pinch of salt, despite Hodges's scepticism. Just as they are about to exit the roof, Mainwaring, Hodges and their men are trapped in a thunderstorm by a falling ladder, leading Mainwaring to ask Wilson if "the Fire Brigade wouldn't mind popping round".

Cast

Arthur Lowe as Captain Mainwaring
John Le Mesurier as Sergeant Wilson
Clive Dunn as Lance Corporal Jones
John Laurie as Private Frazer
James Beck as Private Walker
Arnold Ridley as Private Godfrey
Ian Lavender as Private Pike
Bill Pertwee as ARP Warden Hodges
Frank Williams as The Vicar
Edward Sinclair as The Verger
Rose Hill as Mrs. Cole
Don Estelle as Gerald

Further reading

External links

Dad's Army (series 4) episodes
1970 British television episodes